Falling is a 1999 novel by British writer Elizabeth Jane Howard. It was later filmed as a drama for ITV.

Plot summary
The book tells the story of a relationship that develops between Henry Kent, a sociopath and fantasist who preys on lonely rich women, and Daisy Langrish, an ageing novelist with two broken marriages behind her.

After meeting Daisy—who has recently bought a cottage in order to start a new life in the country—Henry quickly falls in love with her, and sets about tricking his way into her confidence.

He initially offers to become her gardener—something she reluctantly accepts—then later begins to correspond with her after she suffers an accident during a prolonged trip abroad.  These letters start as run of the mill pieces, but as he perceives that she is taking an interest in him, Henry begins to weave her a series of elaborate stories about his life, designed to gain her attention and win her affection.

When Daisy eventually returns home and Henry makes himself indispensable to her after she suffers a fall, they begin an affair.  But when Daisy's family and friends learn about the nature of the relationship, they become concerned and start to investigate Henry.  However, they soon begin to fear that the facts they unearth about his past might have come to light too late to save Daisy from harm.

Howard wrote this novel based on her real life affair with a con-man, as described in her memoir, Slipstream.

Television adaptation
In 2005, the book was made into a drama for ITV, starring Michael Kitchen and Penelope Wilton. It was directed by Tristram Powell and the screenplay was written by Andrew Davies. Filming took place in Autumn 2004, in locations across Leeds, Wakefield and Bradford, along with the Leeds and Liverpool Canal.

References

External links
 
 Elizabeth Jane Howard: Falling 

1999 British novels
2005 television films
2005 films
Films set in England
Television shows set in England
Films shot in Leeds
Films shot in Wakefield
Films shot in Bradford
Television shows shot in Leeds
Television shows shot in Wakefield
Television shows shot in Bradford
Novels about writers
British novels adapted into films
British television films
Macmillan Publishers books